Jan Schreiber (born 1941) is an American poet, translator, and literary critic who has been part of the renascence of formal poetry that began in the late twentieth century. He is the author of five books of verse, two books of verse translation and one book of literary criticism. He was a co-founder of the literary magazine, Canto: Review of the Arts, which flourished in the 1970s, and as a literary editor he launched the poetry chapbook series at the Godine Press. He is a recipient of the Carey Thomas Award for creative publishing.

Born in Wisconsin, Schreiber attended Stanford University, where he received his BA, then earned an MA at the University of Toronto and a PhD at Brandeis University where he studied with the poet J.V. Cunningham. Although he taught for brief periods at Tufts University and Lowell Technological Institute (now the University of Massachusetts Lowell), he spent most of his life as a researcher in the social sciences (founding the Social Science Research Institute) and a software entrepreneur (founding MicroSolve Corporation).
 
As a poet, Schreiber has written mainly in traditional forms. Though most of his verse consists of short lyric poems, he is also known for sharp, satirical epigrams of the kind commonly associated with Cunningham, and he has produced a few longer works extending to some 150 lines.

Beginning in 2004 Schreiber began writing for the on-line journal Contemporary Poetry Review, for which he produced numerous critical articles, some on individual poets, some on influential critics and scholars, and some on the development of the poetic canon. Many of these essays later appeared in his book Sparring with the Sun.

Examples of his work as a poet appear in the on-line anthologies The Hypertexts and Poem Tree and in Lay Bare the Canvas, an anthology of poems about works of art. Seven of his poems were set to music by Paul Alan Levi in a song cycle for tenor and piano called Zeno's Arrow, which has been performed in Massachusetts and New York.

Since 2010 Schreiber has been closely involved in the Symposium on Poetry Criticism, which he co-founded, held annually at Western State Colorado University as part of its Writing the Rockies literary conference.

In 2015 he was named Poet Laureate for the town of Brookline, Massachusetts. He serves as advisory editor for Think, a magazine of poetry, fiction, and essays.

Bibliography
Sparring With the Sun: Poets and the Ways We Think about Poetry in the Late Days of Modernism, Champaign, Ill.: Antilever Press, 2013

Poetry 

Digressions, Toronto: Aliquando Press, 1970

Wily Apparitions, Omaha: Cummington Press, 1992

Bell Buoys, Toronto: Aliquando Press, 1998

Peccadilloes, Hemet, California: White Violet Press, 2014

Bay Leaves, American Fork, Utah: Kelsay Books, 2019

Translations
A Stroke upon the Sea (translations of poems by Walther von der Vogelweide), Aliquando Press, 1982

Sketch of a Serpent (translations of poems by Paul Valéry), Robert Barth, 1986

The Poems of Paul Valéry (translations of the complete poems by Paul Valéry, with an introduction and afterword), Cambridge Scholars, 2021

External links
 Jan Schreiber
 Contemporary Poetry Review
 Think Journal

American male poets
1941 births
Living people
Stanford University alumni
Brandeis University alumni
Tufts University faculty
University of Massachusetts Lowell faculty
Poets from Wisconsin